Prudhoe is a town in Northumberland, England.

Prudhoe may also refer to:

Related to Prudhoe, England
 Prudhoe Castle
 Algernon Percy, 4th Duke of Northumberland (1792–1865), known as Lord Prudhoe between 1816 and 1847
 Prudhoe Town F.C., football club
 Prudhoe railway station, railway station on the Tyne Valley line

Related to Prudhoe Bay, Alaska
 Prudhoe Bay, Alaska, a census-designated place (CDP) in Alaska
 Deadhorse Airport, also known as Prudhoe Airport
 Prudhoe Bay Oil Field, oil field on Alaska's North Slope
 Prudhoe Bay oil spill, a 2006 oil spill
 BP Prudhoe Bay Royalty Trust, New York-based owners of the oil field

People with the surname Prudhoe
 Lord Prudhoe (see above)
 Mark Prudhoe (born 1963), English football goalkeeper
 William Prudhoe (1832–1908), mayor of Christchurch, New Zealand

Other
 Prudhoe Lions, pair of Ancient Egyptian monumental sculptures